Peace, Propaganda & the Promised Land is a 2004 documentary by Sut Jhally and Bathsheba Ratzkoff which—according to the film's official website—"provides a striking comparison of U.S. and international media coverage of the crisis in the Middle East, zeroing in on how structural distortions in U.S. coverage have reinforced false perceptions of the Israeli–Palestinian conflict" and which "analyzes and explains how—through the use of language, framing and context—the Israeli occupation of the West Bank and Gaza remains hidden in the news media". The film argues that the influence of pro-Israel media watchdog groups, such as CAMERA and Honest Reporting, has led to distorted and pro-Israel media reports. It features Noam Chomsky, Robert Jensen, Hanan Ashrawi, Sam Husseini, and Robert Fisk, among others.

In its response to the movie, the Jewish Community Relations Council (JCRC) of San Francisco, a Jewish communal advocacy organization, criticized the film for not discussing the influence of "the numerous pro‐Palestinian media watchdog groups, including FAIR (Fairness and Accuracy in Reporting, which describes itself as 'A National Media Watch Group'), whose spokesperson played a prominent role in the film".

A review in The New York Times by Ned Martel found that the film "largely ignores Palestinian leadership, which has surely played a part in the conflict's broken vows and broken hearts. And such a lack of dispassion weakens the one-sided film's bold and detailed argument".

See also 
 The media
 Media coverage of the Arab–Israeli conflict
 Media bias
 Propaganda
 Spin
 Hasbara
 The conflict
 Arab–Israeli conflict
 Israeli–Palestinian conflict
 Second Intifada

References 

2004 films
Documentary films about politics
Documentary films about the media
Documentary films about the Israeli–Palestinian conflict
American documentary films
2004 documentary films
2000s American films